The Moheli brush warbler (Nesillas mariae) is a species of Old World warbler in the family Acrocephalidae.
It is found only in Comoros.
Its natural habitat is subtropical or tropical moist montane forests.

References

Moheli brush warbler
Endemic birds of the Comoros
Moheli brush warbler
Moheli brush warbler
Taxonomy articles created by Polbot